Clanvowe is a surname. Notable people with the surname include:

John Clanvowe (1341–1391), Welsh diplomat, soldier, and poet
Thomas Clanvowe (died 1410), British landowner, politician, and sheriff